Eegah (sometimes stylized as Eegah! and also known as Eegah: The Name Written in Blood) is a 1962 American horror film directed by Arch Hall Sr. (as Nicholas Merriwether) and starring Arch Hall Jr., Marilyn Manning and Richard Kiel.

It was listed in the 1978 book The Fifty Worst Films of All Time, and was featured in a 1993 episode of Mystery Science Theater 3000 and a 2010 episode of Elvira's Movie Macabre. Eegah is often considered to be among the worst films ever made.

Plot
One night after shopping, Roxy Miller (Marilyn Manning) is driving to a party through the California desert when she nearly runs her car into Eegah (Richard Kiel), a giant caveman. She tells her boyfriend Tom Nelson (Arch Hall Jr.) and her father Robert Miller (Arch Hall Sr.) about the giant. Her father, a writer of adventure books, decides to go into the desert to look for the creature and possibly take a photograph of it. When his helicopter ride fails to show up at his designated pickup time, Tom and Roxy go looking for him.

Roxy is soon kidnapped by Eegah and taken back to his cave while Tom searches for her. In Eegah's cave, Roxy is reunited with her father, who tells her that he has begun to communicate with the caveman and has developed a theory as to the creature's astounding longevity. When a frisky Eegah expresses what seems to be a romantic interest in Roxy, her father, fearful that the creature may kill them both if he is rebuffed, suggests she put up with as much of it as she can bear. Eegah never tries anything too explicit, though, and Roxy even ends up giving him a shave before Tom arrives and helps the Millers escape. Crushed, Eegah follows them back to civilization, a final confrontation ensues, and Eegah is killed.

Cast
 Arch Hall Jr. as Tom Nelson
 Marilyn Manning as Roxy Miller
 Richard Kiel as Eegah
 Arch Hall Sr. as Robert Miller
 Clay Stearns as Band Member
 Bob Davis as George
 Deke Richards as Band Member 
 Ron Shane as Detective
 Addalyn Pollitt as George's Wife
 Lloyd Williams as Mr. Kruger, Helicopter Pilot
 Ray Dennis Steckler as Mr. Fishman
 Bill Rice as Chef
 Carolyn Brandt as Fishman's Girl

Production 
 
Following the financial success of his first venture into the drive-in/juvenile delinquency genre, The Choppers, Arch Hall Sr. was able to fund Eegah, a starring vehicle for his son, Arch Hall Jr., who had some success with songwriter Alan O'Day on the rock and roll/surf rock scene in Los Angeles. Hall Sr. co-wrote the film with Bob Wehling, directed the picture under the pseudonym Nicholas Merriweather, and co-starred opposite his son under the name William Watters. While the library music used to underscore the picture was supplied by André Brummer (under the name Henri Price), an uncredited O'Day ended up being the music editor on Eegah.

Hall Sr. looked to create an Elvis Presley-style screen persona for his son and made sure that Eegah was peppered with various rock and roll songs (including two songs he wrote called "Vicky" and "Valerie"). The film attempts elements of traditional schlock-horror and youth-comedy genres and anticipates the 1960s "beach party" genre. One of the members of the rock and roll band shown in the film was Deke Lussier, who, as Deke Richards, later became a highly respected songwriter and record producer at Motown Records.

Hall Sr.'s company, Fairway-International Pictures, located in Burbank, California, was also Hall's place of residence and doubled for a number of locations in the picture, including the Millers' apartment.

Assistant cameraman Ray Dennis Steckler appears in the picture as Mr. Fischer, the man at the hotel who is thrown at the pool near the end of the picture. Steckler, who had previously moved to Hollywood to become a cameraman, made his directing debut the next year in the Arch Hall Jr. vehicle Wild Guitar. Steckler's first independent feature, The Incredibly Strange Creatures Who Stopped Living and Became Mixed-Up Zombies!!?, was later distributed by Fairway-International.

Reception and legacy 
Often considered to be one of the worst films ever made, the film has a rare approval rating of 0% on Rotten Tomatoes, with 8 critical reviews. The first real notoriety the film had past its initial release was being included in the 1978 book The Fifty Worst Films of All Time. In his Classic Movie Guide, film critic Leonard Maltin awarded the film a "bomb", his lowest rating possible, calling it "A staple at 'All-Time Worst Film' festivals". Writing in DVD Talk, critic Ian Jane described the film as "terrible in all the right ways" and "about as bottom of the barrel as they come".

The film is listed in Golden Raspberry Award founder John Wilson's book The Official Razzie Movie Guide as one of the "100 Most Enjoyably Bad Movies Ever Made."

In 1993, Eegah! was featured on Comedy Central's cult television series Mystery Science Theater 3000 and became a fan favorite. In the published episode guide to the series, The Mystery Science Theater 3000 Amazing Colossal Episode Guide, the cast considers the shaving scene from Eegah, in which Eegah lolls his tongue around and laps up shaving cream, to be one of the most disgusting things they have witnessed during their time on the show. The writers also speculate that some kind of romantic relationship existed between Arch Hall Sr. and his on-screen daughter Marilyn Manning, due to the uncomfortably non-familial chemistry in their scenes together. One of the film's more inept moments became a running joke on the show: Hall Sr.'s line "Watch out for snakes!" is blurted out despite a lack of any visual source for the dialog.

In 2009, Eegah! was featured in a season five episode of the television series Cinema Insomnia.

Home media 
The film is in the public domain and has been released on home video a number of times, both as stand-alone versions and as part of multi-film collections.

The MST3K version of the movie was released on DVD in March 2000 by Rhino Home Video. As of January 2010, the DVD was out of print, and as of July 2011, it was no longer available on the official MST3K website. It was reissued on DVD by Shout Factory on May 22, 2018, as part of The Singles Collection. MST3K launched "The Gizmoplex" to the public on May 8, 2022, a new headquarters for all things Mystery Science Theater 3000 related, and "Eegah" is available for purchase in digital streaming form directly from their new website at gizmoplex.com.

The Cinema Insomnia episode featuring the film was released on DVD by Apprehensive Films on April 13, 2009.

On November 1, 2019, The Film Detective announced a new 4K restoration of Eegah would be released on DVD and Blu-ray on November 26, 2019, with the Blu-ray being a limited edition of only 1,500 copies in collaboration with Shout! Factory, Something Weird Video, and Cinema Preservation Alliance. Special features included subtitles, the complete MST3K version of the movie, an interview with MST3K creator Joel Hodgson, and an interview with star Arch Hall Jr.

See also
 List of American films of 1962

References

External links 

 
 
 
 
 

1962 films
1962 horror films
1962 independent films
1960s English-language films
Films shot in Los Angeles
American independent films
1960s monster movies
Films about cavemen
1960s rediscovered films
Rediscovered American films
Films about father–daughter relationships
1960s American films